Adamovich is a Slavic patronymic surname derived from the given name Adam.

Notable people with the surname include:
Ales Adamovich (1927–1994), Belarusian writer
Georgy Adamovich (1892–1972), Russian writer
Igor von Adamovich, member of P9, a Brazilian pop group
Mikhail Adamovich (1884–1947), Russian painter
Tatyana Adamovich (b. 1942), Russian-born American Olympic fencer



Russian-language surnames
Belarusian-language surnames
Patronymic surnames